The 2016 Asia Rugby Women's Sevens Series is the seventeenth edition of Asia's continental sevens tournament for women. It was played over three legs hosted in Hong Kong, South Korea, and Sri Lanka.

Hong Kong
The first leg was held at the Hong Kong Football Club Stadium.

Pool C

Pool D

Plate Semi-Finals

Cup Semi-Finals

Hong Kong Standings

Korea

The second leg was held at the Namdong Asiad Rugby Field.

Pool C

Pool D

Plate Semi-Finals

Cup Semi-Finals

Hong Kong Standings

Colombo
The third and final leg was held at the Race Course International Rugby Stadium.

Pool C

Pool D

Plate Semi-Finals

Cup Semi-Finals

Colombo Standings

Final standings

References

2016
2016 rugby sevens competitions
2016 in Asian rugby union
2016 in women's rugby union
International rugby union competitions hosted by Hong Kong
International rugby union competitions hosted by South Korea
International rugby union competitions hosted by Sri Lanka
2016 in Hong Kong women's sport
2016 in South Korean women's sport
2016 in Sri Lankan sport